Metagenes was a man in ancient Crete, son of the Cretan architect Chersiphron, and was also an architect himself.

He was co-architect, along with his father, of the construction of the Temple of Artemis at Ephesus, one of the Seven Wonders of the Ancient World.

The architect's name is recalled in Vitruvius's De architectura.

References

Ancient Greek architects
Ancient Cretan architects
Ephesus
Ancient Knossians